The Immediate Geographic Region of Pará de Minas is one of the 6 immediate geographic regions in the Intermediate Geographic Region of Divinópolis, one of the 70 immediate geographic regions in the Brazilian state of Minas Gerais and one of the 509 of Brazil, created by the National Institute of Geography and Statistics (IBGE) in 2017.

Municipalities 
It comprises 7 municipalities.

 Igaratinga  
 Maravilhas
 Onça de Pitangui     
 Papagaios     
 Pará de Minas    
 Pequi     
 São José da Varginha

See also 

 List of Intermediate and Immediate Geographic Regions of Minas Gerais

References 

Geography of Minas Gerais